Allak station is a railway station of the Donghae Line in Allak-dong, Dongnae District, Busan, South Korea.

History
It started on August 16, 1989, as a temporary platform. In 2008, it stopped handling passengers. In 2016, it became a part of the Busan Metro Donghae Line and was promoted to a non-placement simple station by opening a wide area railway.

Station layout

References

External links
 

Dongnae District
Korail stations
Railway stations in Busan
1989 establishments in South Korea
Railway stations opened in 1989
20th-century architecture in South Korea